Cupid's Knockout is a 1926 American silent comedy action film directed by Bruce Mitchell and starring Frank Merrill, Andrée Tourneur and George B. French.

Synopsis
Milkman Frank Gibson rescues Sally Hibbard who is under pressure from a corrupt city boss to marry her.

Cast 
 Frank Merrill	Frank Gibson
 Andrée Tourneur as Sally Hibbard
 Don Fuller as 	David Manning
 Marco Charles as 'Measles' Martin
 George B. French as 	George Hibbard 
 Mathilde Brundage as 	Mrs. Hibbard
 William T. Hayes as 'Rubber Chin' Smith

References

Bibliography
 Connelly, Robert B. The Silents: Silent Feature Films, 1910-36, Volume 40, Issue 2. December Press, 1998.
 Munden, Kenneth White. The American Film Institute Catalog of Motion Pictures Produced in the United States, Part 1. University of California Press, 1997.

External links
 

1926 films
1920s action comedy films
American silent feature films
American action comedy films
American black-and-white films
Films directed by Bruce M. Mitchell
1920s English-language films
1920s American films
Silent American comedy films